Terefe Ejigu (born 14 October 1988) is an Ethiopian-born New Zealand long distance runner.

Early life
He was born as Terefe Tsegaye Ejigu in Ethiopia.  In 2001 at the age of 13 he fled violence in Ethiopia with his siblings. He settled in Wellington, New Zealand with his family where he enrolled at  Wellington College.  At the time, he spoke no English. While at the college, he began training as a runner, setting a new national junior record for the 5000 m. He attended Victoria University of Wellington to earn a degree in development studies. In 2009, he was awarded a $100,000 scholarship from Eastern Michigan University in the United States.  In 2012 he won first team ALL-MAC honors for his academic achievement at the university. In 2012, Ejigu won the 5000 m at the Mid-American Conference Indoor Track and Field Championships. He also won the mile race and finished second in the 3000 m. Filmmaker Anna Cottrell documented Ejigu's life story in the documentary Running For His Life.

Achievements

References 

Ethiopian male long-distance runners
Victoria University of Wellington alumni
New Zealand male long-distance runners
Eastern Michigan Eagles men's track and field athletes
Eastern Michigan Eagles men's cross country runners
1988 births
Living people
Ethiopian emigrants to New Zealand